Katie Gold is a New Zealand potter.

Education 
Gold is originally from Wairarapa. Gold lives in the Upper Moutere region near Nelson in New Zealand. She completed a certificate in handwoven textiles from Nelson Polytechnic, followed by a Certificate and Diploma in Craft Design. She was Graduate Resident in pottery at the Nelson Polytechnic and also taught pottery at the Nelson Community Potters.

Gold's work is mainly handbuilt, focusing on slab-constructed domestic ware with highly textured surfaces. She layers and joins slabs, texturing with stamps, rolling pins and lino-cutting tools. Gold makes her own glazes. Her colours and shapes are inspired by marine environments, incorporating shells, boats, lighthouses and crustaceans. Her range of handbag, boot and shoe-inspired works was featured at Form Gallery in the Christchurch Art Gallery in 2005.

Gold's work has featured in the 1991 and 1994 Fletcher Challenge shows and the New Zealand Society of Potters' Royal Easter Show. She won the Premier Award at the 1996 Cleveland Charitable Foundation Trust show in Dunedin, and in 1997 won the first prize at both the Cleveland and the Birkenhead Award exhibitions.

Personal life 
Gold is married to potter Owen Bartlett.

References

External links 
Artist's website

New Zealand potters
Year of birth missing (living people)
Living people
People from the Wairarapa